Yuri Oliveira Ribeiro (born 24 January 1997) is a Portuguese professional footballer who plays as a left-back or wing-back for Polish club Legia Warsaw.

Club career

Benfica
Born in Switzerland to Portuguese migrant parents, Ribeiro moved to Vieira do Minho, Braga District at the age of two. He started playing football at Escola Os Craques when he was 9. He joined S.C. Braga's academy four years later and, at the age of 13, signed for S.L. Benfica, where he went on to finish his development and win the 2013 juvenile national championship.

Ribeiro made his senior debut for Benfica's reserves on 29 May 2015, starting in a 2–1 home win over Vitória S.C. B in the Segunda Liga. He started the following season as a backup to Pedro Rebocho but was called to action when the latter injured himself at Varzim SC.

Ribeiro first appeared in official matches with the first team on 14 December 2016, playing the entire 3–0 away victory over Real S.C. in the round of 16 of the Taça de Portugal. The following 3 January, he also started against F.C. Vizela in the Taça da Liga (4–0 win at the Estádio da Luz in the group stage).

On 30 June 2017, Ribeiro joined Rio Ave F.C. on a season-long loan deal. His maiden appearance in the Primeira Liga took place on 7 August, in a 1–0 home defeat of C.F. Os Belenenses. He totalled 29 games in his year in Vila do Conde, and scored a first career goal in a 2–0 home win over Boavista F.C. the following 21 January.

Ribeiro returned to Benfica for the 2018–19 campaign, extending his contract with the club for an additional five years. On 14 February 2019, he made his European debut as they beat Galatasaray SK 2–1 in the first leg of the UEFA Europa League round of 32, their first-ever victory in Turkey.

Nottingham Forest
On 8 July 2019, Ribeiro joined English side Nottingham Forest on a permanent deal, along with Benfica teammate Alfa Semedo who also moved to the City Ground but on a season-long loan. He made his debut on 13 August in the first round of the EFL Cup, playing the full 90 minutes of a 3–0 home win over Fleetwood Town, and went on to make the starting position his own ahead of Jack Robinson.

Ribeiro scored his first goal for the club on 15 December 2020, in a 2–0 victory against Sheffield Wednesday. He was released the following June.

Legia Warsaw
On 23 August 2021, Ribeiro signed a three-year contract with Legia Warsaw.

International career
Ribeiro represented Portugal in the 2014 UEFA European Under-17 Championship, helping his team reach the semi-finals, where they lost to eventual winners England. On 7 July 2016, he was selected by the under-19 side for that year's European Championship in Germany.

On 2 September 2016, Ribeiro won his first cap for the under-21s at 19, featuring the full 90 minutes in a 0–0 home draw with Israel for the 2017 European Championship qualifiers.

Personal life
Ribeiro was named after Youri Djorkaeff after his parents saw the French international play. His father was a goalkeeper, and his older brother, Romeu, also played for Benfica and Portugal at youth level.

Career statistics

Honours
Benfica
Taça de Portugal: 2016–17

References

External links

Portuguese League profile

1997 births
Living people
Swiss people of Portuguese descent
People from Vieira do Minho
Sportspeople from Braga District
Portuguese footballers
Association football defenders
Primeira Liga players
Liga Portugal 2 players
S.C. Braga players
S.L. Benfica B players
S.L. Benfica footballers
Rio Ave F.C. players
English Football League players
Nottingham Forest F.C. players
Ekstraklasa players
III liga players
Legia Warsaw players
Legia Warsaw II players
Portugal youth international footballers
Portugal under-21 international footballers
Portuguese expatriate footballers
Expatriate footballers in England
Expatriate footballers in Poland
Portuguese expatriate sportspeople in England
Portuguese expatriate sportspeople in Poland